Antaeotricha aequabilis is a moth of the family Depressariidae. It is found in French Guiana.

The wingspan is 23–24 mm. The forewings are white with the dorsal half more or less suffused with light fuscous-grey, and with three ill-defined darker fuscous dorsal blotches not reaching half across the wing, two posterior with oblique cloudy shades extending from them obliquely inwards to above the middle. The hindwings are grey, paler anteriorly.

References

Moths described in 1916
aequabilis
Taxa named by Edward Meyrick
Moths of South America